The prime minister of Tunisia is the head of government of Tunisia since the creation of the office in 1759 till its abolition in 1957 with the proclamation of the Republic. The office was revived in 1969 under the Republican system. There have been 44 prime ministers of Tunisia since the office came into existence in 1759.

The office existed before independence as the King of Tunisia appointed a Prime Minister to be the head of government. Rejeb Khaznadar was the first Prime Minister in the history of Tunisia in 1759.

After the abolition of monarchy, the 1959 Constitution of Tunisia established a presidential system where the president was both the head of state and the head of government. On November 1969, President Habib Bourguiba brought back the position by appointing Bahi Ladgham to be the first Prime Minister under the republican system.

Before the 2011 revolution, the role of the prime minister was limited to assisting the president. With the adoption of the new constitution in 2014, the constitutional powers expanded, making the prime minister responsible of major domestic policies.

The youngest person to become prime minister was Mustapha Ben Ismail in 1878 at 28 years of age while the oldest was Beji Caid Essebsi in 2011 at 85 years of age. The term of Mohammed Aziz Bouattour (1882–1907) is the longest for a prime minister, with a period of nearly 25 years, while Zine El Abidine Ben Ali's term (1987) is the shortest with 36 days.

Three prime ministers became presidents afterwards: Habib Bourguiba, Zine El Abidine Ben Ali, and Beji Caid Essebsi.

There are currently seven living former prime ministers. The most recent former prime minister to die is Hamed Karoui on 27 March 2020.

List of prime ministers

Monarchy

Republic

Statistics

Monarchy

Timeline

Rank by time in office

Republic

Timeline

Rank by time in office

See also 
 Politics of Tunisia
 List of beys of Tunis
 List of French residents-general in Tunisia
 President of Tunisia
 List of presidents of Tunisia
 First Lady of Tunisia
 Prime Minister of Tunisia

Notes

References 

Prime Ministers of Tunisia
Tunisia
Prime Ministers